Korond (also known as Kerend) is a village in Korond Rural District of the Central District of Boshruyeh County, South Khorasan province, Iran. At the 2006 National Census, its population was 549 in 156 households, when it was in the former Boshruyeh District of Ferdows County. The following census in 2011 counted 499 people in 165 households, by which time the district had been separated from the county and Boshruyeh County established. The latest census in 2016 showed a population of 593 people in 201 households; it was the largest village in its rural district.

References 

Boshruyeh County

Populated places in South Khorasan Province

Populated places in Boshruyeh County